The National Police Agency is an agency that is part of the Government of Mongolia and acts as a reserve force for the Armed Forces of Mongolia. It is currently an agency of the Mongolian Ministry of Justice and Home Affairs and is the primary law enforcement organization in Mongolia. The Police is assisted by the Directorate of the Internal Troops of Mongolia.

History

In 1866 the Qing rulers established a police force for the 15 districts of the Khüree (Ulaanbaatar) area colloquially named "fifteener police" ( arvan tavny tsagdaa). After the Mongolian Revolution of 1911 and the independence of Outer Mongolia it became a national police force. The founding day of the Militsiya style police force was 19 July 1921, when the 6th Session of the Ulsyn Baga Khural (Little Khural) decreed to establish the "Preventive Militia" ( tsagdan sergiilekh) with the same mandat as a modern police force. This order came days after the Mongolian Revolution of 1921 which led to the declaration of the Mongolian People's Republic in 1924.

From 1934 to 1940, specialized departments were established throughout the various Aimags. From 1940 to 1960, the Prosecutor's Office instituted a law enforcement body to enforce the new Constitution of Mongolia, the Criminal Law and the Criminal Procedure Code. In the 1960s, the structure and organization of the police were expanded and in 1965, made a separate institution from the Prosecutor's Office. In celebration of the 50th anniversary of the establishment of the police, the Military Institute was established by the decree of the Presidium of the People's Great Khural on 14 July 1984. The institute now takes the form of the Law Enforcement University of Mongolia.

From its establishment until 1990s, the agency was under the joint command of the Ministry of the Interior and the Ministry of Public Security. As a result of the political and revolutionary transitions and market economy in 1990s, the police underwent a drastic transformation and was reestablished as the National Police Agency of the Government of Mongolia mandated to combat crime and maintain safety on a national basis with an International Police Department being established a year later. In 1993, the State Great Hural approved the "Law on Police Organization" in order to establish legal basis for law enforcement.

Organization
The agency is headed by a Director assisted by a First Deputy Director and two Deputy Directors.

There are several departments such as: 

Administration
Finance and Logistic
Criminal Police
Investigations
Inquiry
Traffic Police
Information Research
Public Order
Communications Division
Police Academy

Below the central level, there are Police Departments and Divisions in the 21 provinces and in Ulaanbaatar, further subdivided into Divisions, Units and Sections. The largest police training institution is the Mongolian Police Academy. As in many 
such institutions, the police academy operates within a hierarchical structure.

Ranks
The NPA utilizes the following ranks:
Top ranks:
Director (1)
First Deputy Director (1)
Deputy Director (2)
Senior ranks:
Police Colonel
Police Lieutenant Colonel
Police Major
Middle ranks:
Police Captain
Police Senior Lieutenant
Police Lieutenant
Junior ranks:
Police First Sergeant
Police Trainer Sergeant
Police Senior Sergeant
Police Sergeant
Police Junior Sergeant

Symbols

Logo
The logo of the NPA is a white falcon, a Mongolian symbol of sharp eyes, bravery, and justice.

Slogan
The official slogan of the NPA is: "Striving together for peaceful and secure life".

Ensemble
The Suld Ensemble of the Mongolian Police was founded in 1991 as the official musical unit of the National Police Agency. Its founder, Colonel Pürevjavyn Khayankhyarvaa, was the former Head of the Military Music Service of the General Staff of the Mongolian People's Army. It consists of a group of professional artists, all of whom are part of the Mongolian Police Academy. In November 2018, a singer of the ensemble won the award at a competition for best performer of a Chinese classical song.

See also
Law enforcement in Mongolia

References

Gendarmerie
Law enforcement in Mongolia
Establishments in Mongolia
Government agencies established in 1921
Government agencies established in 1965